"A-Ba-Ni-Bi" (bet-language language game for the word  aní, meaning "I" in Hebrew) was the winning song in the Eurovision Song Contest 1978, performed for  by Izhar Cohen and Alphabeta.

Description 
This was Israel's first Eurovision win, which meant under the rules of the contest that they would host the following year's contest, marking the first time that the Eurovision Song Contest would take place outside Europe. According to broadcaster John Kennedy O'Connor, broadcasters in many of the non-participating Arab countries in North Africa and Asia, who had been transmitting the contest, had to cut the broadcast when it was clear Israel was going to win. Jordanian television cut the broadcast and showed pictures of flowers.

The song (written by Ehud Manor and composed and conducted by Nurit Hirsh, a duo who had collaborated frequently in writing Israeli Eurovision entries, including the country's debut) is an up-tempo disco number, heralding a move towards this style of performance in later years. While sometimes derided as a weak entry – particularly given its title – the song is regarded by most fans as one of the better entries in Contest history, often being performed as part of a medley of favourites, as at the introduction to the 2006 semi-final in Athens.

The song deals with the way in which children relate to love. Cohen sings that, growing up, "we loved secretly/Who were we nice to? — Just uncles and aunts" and that love was conducted secretly and "We whispered only in the 'bet language'". He compares this to adulthood, where he realises that "Love is a beautiful word" and that humanity should "speak in a language of love", instead of the language of secrecy.  For this reason, the song uses the Bet language - a children's language game where each syllable of the word is repeated with a bet preceding the consonant.  Thus, the Hebrew a-ni  o-hev  o-tach ("I love you") becomes a-ba-ni-bi  o-bo-he-be-v  o-bo-ta-ba-ch. Mistakenly, the song title was captioned on screen at the contest as being "Ah-Bah-Nee-Bee" and was further confused in the UK singles market when listed on the official singles chart compiled by Music Week as "A-Bi-Ni-Bi". Musically, the song is somewhat unusual among Contest entries for ending almost immediately after the key change — most entries have either a bridge or a repetition of the chorus after this point.

At the contest, Cohen and his five backing vocalists (two men, Reuven Erez and Itzhak Okev, and three women, Lisa Gold-Rubin, Nehama Shutan, and Esther Tzuberi) all wore white clothing and remained mostly stationary, swaying in time to the music.

The song was performed eighteenth on the night, following 's Baccara with "Parlez-vous français?" and preceding 's Springtime with "Mrs. Caroline Robinson". At the close of voting, it had received 157 points, placing first in a field of 20. The song received points from every other voting country except , including 6 sets of maximum 12 points.

Israel thus became the third country, after  (1968 and 1969) and Luxembourg (1972 and 1973), to win the contest twice in successive years. It was covered by Grup Vitamin, Turkish parody music group as "Acaba bu ne baba be?" ("I wonder what is this dad, hey?" in Turkish) in Aşkın gözyaşları ("Tears of Love"), which was their 1994 album.

A parody of this song, with identical Hebrew lyrics in the first two lines and two lines in Mandarin Chinese, was used as the opening song of Hong Kong broadcaster TVB's 2009 game show Boom Boom Ba.

The song was performed in 2018, on a one-stringed guitar by Israeli singer Netta Barzilai who won the Eurovision Song Contest 2018.

Cover versions

The song was covered by:
 Connie Francis
 Frederik in Finnish, as "Rakkauden aika."
 El Chaval de la Peca (Marc Parrot) in Spanish.
It was also parodied as "I wanna be a polar bear" (intentionally misheard lyrics).
 Grup Vitamin in Turkish, as "Acaba bu ne baba be."

See also
 Music of Israel
 Culture of Israel
 Ubbi dubbi
 Opish

References

External links
 
 
 

Eurovision songs of 1978
Eurovision songs of Israel
Hebrew-language songs
1978 songs
Songs with music by Nurit Hirsh
Eurovision Song Contest winning songs
Polydor Records singles